The acronym ESDP may refer to:
 European Security and Defence Policy the former name of the European Union's Common Security and Defence Policy
 The European Spatial Development Planning network
 European Spatial Development Perspective
 Essential Skills Development Program at Humber College - Lakeshore Campus
 Enhanced Service Discovery Protocol - Bluetooth.org
 The Egyptian Social Democratic Party